Stefanie Wilder-Taylor is an American humorist. She worked for years as a writer and producer on game shows including Love Lounge (2005), The Dating Game (1997), and Blind Date (1999). She then became famous for a series of books in which she displayed an irreverent attitude toward parenthood. In The New York Times in 2009, Jan Hoffman wrote, "Ms. Wilder-Taylor, a former stand-up comic, has made a career from championing cocktail play-date attitude. With books like Sippy Cups Are Not for Chardonnay and Naptime Is the New Happy Hour and her scabrously funny Web column, 'Make Mine a Double: Tales of Twins and Tequila,' she has been the toast of the antiperfection mom-lit world."

Taylor was born in Queens, New York City.  Her father was the standup comedian Stanley Myron Handelman. She has been married to Jon Taylor, a television producer, since 2005.  The couple has three children and resides in Encino, California.

Published works 
Sippy Cups Are Not for Chardonnay Gallery Books, April 1, 2006 
Naptime Is the New Happy Hour Simon Spotlight Entertainment, March 25, 2008 
It's Not Me, It's You: Subjective Recollections from a Terminally Optimistic, Chronically Sarcastic and Occasionally Inebriated Woman Gallery Books, September 14, 2010, 
I'm Kind of a Big Deal: And Other Delusions of Adequacy Gallery Books, June 7, 2011 
Gummi Bears Should Not Be Organic: And Other Opinions I Can't Back Up With Facts Gallery Books,  April 7, 2015 
 In Your Right Mind - a weekly talk radio broadcast.

References

External links
Official page
Stefanie Wilder-Taylor on Larry King Live March 26, 2010

American bloggers
People from Queens, New York
Living people
Year of birth missing (living people)
American women non-fiction writers
21st-century American non-fiction writers
American women bloggers
21st-century American women writers